Holmerika is a genus of beetles in the family Buprestidae, containing the following species:

 Holmerika mulanje Bellamy, 1988
 Holmerika orientalis Bellamy, 1988

References

Buprestidae genera